Dustin Thomas Kahia (born June 12, 1989) is an American film director, screenwriter, and producer. He is best known for writing and directing his film, Call of the Void (2016).

Career

Early career 
Kahia started his career making short films. His short film Valediction won the "Human Condition" Audience Choice Award at National Film Festival for Talented Youth in 2012. The film was also an Official Selection of the Newport Beach Film Festival and San Diego Film Festival. As a result, Kahia received some media attention with Autumn McAlpin of the OC Register writing, "The 15 minute film showcases beautiful cinematography and a proficient cast." Bask Magazine reaffirmed that the cast was "outstanding."

Project Guile 
In 2014, Kahia's screenplay Project Guile was named a Finalist at the Nashville Film Festival. 76 finalists were selected from 1,511 entries. In addition, the screenplay earned a Semi-Finalist placement at 18th Annual Fade In Awards and Scriptapalooza Screenplay Competition. Under a revised title, Tumble, the screenplay earned another Semi-Finalist placement at the 2016 ScreenCraft Sci-Fi Screenplay Contest, representing the top ten percent of submissions received.

Call of the Void 
That same year, Kahia launched a successful Kickstarter campaign for his film, Call of the Void. According to the initial campaign, the film was originally intended to be a feature-length film, but later, upon its release, the official runtime of the movie came in at 55 minutes.  The Screen Actors Guild recognizes a feature-length film as having a runtime over 60 minutes, while anything under that runtime is considered a "short film." However, there is some debate in Hollywood as to what qualifies as a feature-length film because the Academy of Motion Picture Arts and Sciences recognizes a feature-length film as having a runtime over 40 minutes.

The 1940s-style film premiered at the 2016 Newport Beach Film Festival, marking the third time a film by Kahia was accepted into the festival. To limit costs, Kahia and the film crew shot Call of the Void in four days in and around downtown Los Angeles. To prepare for the tight filming schedule, Kahia spent about four months planning the shots and layout. He and his collaborators built the sets from scratch and shot at locations like the La Cienega oil fields, where Beverly Hills Cop II was filmed. On the third day of filming, the crew shot 21-pages of the script.

Debbie Lynn Elias, a film critic and radio host, called the film "A stunning psychological noir thriller presented in black & white with a visual grammar and emotional tone that harken to masters like Hitchcock, Preminger, Litvak and Lang." Lynn's sentiments were echoed by Lisa Mejia of The Entertainment Source, "The shot composition is beautiful, and the use of black and white and its play with the shadows brings the audience into the genre with ease." Aaron Neuwirth wrote, "Call of the Void clearly pays homage to key players from the time of film noir. Hitchcock is a notable influence and I personally thought a lot of Fritz Lang in terms of the look and mood of the film. The nature of story also brought to mind Franz Kafka. It is in the way the film balances its sense of atmosphere and attempts to channel classical filmmaking techniques, while presenting a story featuring existential anxiety."

According to Kahia, "The film itself is ultimately an exploration of obsession and attachment, and of how an unhealthy obsession can lead to a person’s downfall. As human beings, we can become very attached to any number of things, whether it be a person, a thing, or even an ideal… and when things do not go our way in life, we can have a hard time letting go, especially when it comes to other people."

Upcoming Projects 
Kahia is attached to direct the upcoming feature film, Crosspoint, a sci-thriller, which he co-wrote with Tian Kok. The film is scheduled to begin filming in May 2023. The plot is currently being kept under wraps. Additionally, Kahia is currently working on another directorial project, a historical drama called The Golden City. The plot is not yet known. However, the screenplay was named a Semifinalist at the 2021 Nashville Film Festival as part of their screenwriting competition. It was also named a Quarterfinalist at The Script Lab 2020 Screenplay Contest.

Awards 
Independent Short Awards (2019), Best Student Short, Rewind — Dustin Kahia
NFFTY (2012), Audience Award ("The Human Condition"), Valediction — Dustin Kahia

Filmography

References 

1989 births
American male screenwriters
American film producers
Living people
American cinematographers
American film editors
Film producers from California
Writers from Los Angeles
Film directors from Los Angeles
Screenwriters from California
21st-century American screenwriters
21st-century American male writers